This list is of the Cultural Properties of Japan designated in the category of   for the Urban Prefecture of Kyōto.

National Cultural Properties
As of 1 September 2015, four hundred and fifteen Important Cultural Properties (including thirty-seven *National Treasures) have been designated, being of national significance.

Prefectural Cultural Properties
As of 24 March 2015, fifty properties have been designated at a prefectural level.

See also
 Cultural Properties of Japan
 List of National Treasures of Japan (sculptures)
 Japanese sculpture
 List of Historic Sites of Japan (Kyōto)
 List of Cultural Properties of Japan - paintings (Kyōto)
 List of Cultural Properties of Japan - historical materials (Kyōto)

References

External links
  Cultural Properties in Kyoto Prefecture
  Municipal Cultural Properties in Kyoto City

Cultural Properties,Kyoto
Cultural Properties,Sculptures
Sculptures,Kyoto
Japan,Kyoto